Amaron should not be confused with Ammaron, Ammoron, or Amoron, three other Book of Mormon figures with similar names.

According to the Book of Mormon, Amaron was a Nephite record keeper, who received the Plates of Nephi from his father Omni in 279 BC. He wrote verses four through eight in the Book of Omni, telling that a large portion of the Nephite civilization was destroyed, in fulfillment of prophecy. According to his brother Chemish, Amaron wrote his section in the day that he delivered the plates to Chemish. His brother Chemish succeeded him as the keeper of the Book of Mormon record.

Possible origin of the name 
Hugh Nibley relates the name to a root meaning "friendly" or "beloved", and states:

"Off-hand, Amaron means 'our beloved'... That root is very rich. Mar is a chief or a prince. The chief friend of the king is a 'mar'. It means 'friendly, friend', or anything like that."

Amaron is also similar to other Book of Mormon names such as Ammaron, Ammoron, Amoron, Moron, Moroni, and Mormon himself etc.

References

Book of Mormon people